San Biagio is a circular Baroque style, Roman Catholic church located outside of the town of Alonte, Province of Vicenza, Veneto, Italy.

History
Documents from 1297 to 1303, note a church at this site, outside the town. In 1631, the church was reconstructed and dedicated to a St Blaise. It remained a parish church till the mid-1800s, when it was abandoned in disrepair. But soon, need for a new parish church led to reconstruction by the engineer Antonion Trevisan in 1868, and further work in 1935.

The circular nave has a well lit, large cupola. The interior has two side altars, one depicting St Blaise, the other the Madonna and Child'' (1892).

References

Baroque architecture in Veneto
Churches in the province of Vicenza
17th-century Roman Catholic church buildings in Italy
Roman Catholic churches completed in 1639
Centralized-plan churches in Italy
1639 establishments in Italy